Lilian Augusta Fontaine (née Ruse, formerly de Havilland; 11 June 1886 – 20 February 1975) was an English actress and mother of  Olivia de Havilland and Joan Fontaine.

Early years
Fontaine was born in Reading, Berkshire. She received a scholarship from Reading College at age 13 for her musical talent and studied acting at the Royal Academy of Dramatic Art in London.

Personal life
After a stage career Fontaine married the British patent attorney Walter de Havilland (1872–1968). Her first daughter, Olivia, was born in 1916, followed by her second daughter, Joan, in 1917. Fontaine decided to end the marriage in 1919 after several years of marital strain and eventual separation; the divorce was not finalised, however, until February 1925.

In 1922, the family moved to California, hoping that the climate there would improve the health of the daughters, who suffered "recurring ailments". De Havilland soon returned to Japan, while his wife and daughters stayed in Saratoga, California, until 1933.

In April 1925, she married the department store manager George M. Fontaine. They were married until his death in 1956. She lived with her two daughters in Saratoga, California, and encouraged them to pursue acting careers.

Career 
Fontaine coached drama students when she lived in Saratoga, California, and she produced plays in a garden theatre that later was named for her.

After both of her daughters reached film stardom, Fontaine returned to acting with a notable role in Billy Wilder's drama The Lost Weekend (1945) as the mother of Jane Wyman's character. She also played supporting roles in two films with her daughter Joan, Ivy (1947) and The Bigamist (1953) and made a few television appearances during the 1950s.

From 1948 to 1958, Fontaine taught an acting class that developed into the Los Gatos Theatre workshop.

Death 
Fontaine died on 20 February 1975 of cancer aged 88.

Legacy 
The Lilian Fontaine Garden Theatre in Saratoga, California, was named in honour of the actress, and that city's Fontaine Drive was also named in her honour.

Filmography

References

External links
 

1886 births
1975 deaths
Alumni of RADA
British emigrants to the United States
British stage actresses
British film actresses
British television actresses
Deaths from cancer in California
De Havilland family
People from Reading, Berkshire
People from Saratoga, California